Joel Lamela Loaces (born January 29, 1971) is a former sprinter from Cuba.

Career

He won an Olympic bronze medal in 4 x 100 metres relay in Barcelona 1992. He specialized in the 100 metres event, and his personal best of 10.53 was set during the 1991 World Championships.

International competitions

External links 
 
 
 

Cuban male sprinters
1971 births
Living people
Olympic athletes of Cuba
Olympic bronze medalists for Cuba
Athletes (track and field) at the 1992 Summer Olympics
Athletes (track and field) at the 1996 Summer Olympics
Athletes (track and field) at the 1991 Pan American Games
Athletes (track and field) at the 1995 Pan American Games
Medalists at the 1992 Summer Olympics
Pan American Games gold medalists for Cuba
Olympic bronze medalists in athletics (track and field)
Pan American Games medalists in athletics (track and field)
Universiade medalists in athletics (track and field)
Goodwill Games medalists in athletics
Universiade bronze medalists for Cuba
Medalists at the 1993 Summer Universiade
Competitors at the 1994 Goodwill Games
Medalists at the 1991 Pan American Games
Medalists at the 1995 Pan American Games
People from Nuevitas
20th-century Cuban people